Anakapalli district is a district in the Indian state of Andhra Pradesh. It was formed on 4 April 2022 from Anakapalli and Narsipatnam revenue divisions of the old Visakhapatnam district. The administrative headquarters are at Anakapalli.

Etymology 
This district is derived from its headquarters Anakapalli.

Geography 
This district is surrounded by Alluri Sitharama Raju district to the north, Kakinada district to the west, the Bay of Bengal to the south and Vizianagaram district and Visakhapatnam district to the east.

Administrative divisions 

The district has two revenue divisions, namely Anakapalli and Narsipatnam, each headed by a sub collector. These revenue divisions are divided into 24 mandals. The district consists of two municipalities and 8 census towns. Anakapalli zone fall under Greater Visakhapatnam Municipal Corporation and the two municipalities in the district are Elamanchili and Narsipatnam. The census towns are Bowluvada, Chodavaram, Kantabamsuguda, Mulakuddu, Nakkapalle, Narsipatnam, Peda Boddepalle, Payakaraopeta.

Mandals 

There are 12 mandals each in Anakapalli and Narsipatnam division. The 24 mandals under their revenue divisions are listed below:

Notable people from Anakapalli district

 Gurajada Apparao, poet and writer
 Aarudra, writer
 Sirivennela Seetharama Sastry, lyricist
 Shobha Naidu, kuchipudi dancer
 Puri Jagannadh, film producer and director
 Gunasekhar, film producer and director

Politics 

There are one parliamentary and 7 assembly constituencies in Anakapalli district. The parliamentary constituencies are 
The assembly constituencies are

Demographics 

At the time of the 2011 census, Anakapalli district had a population of 1,726,998, of which 250,359 (14.50%) live in urban areas. Anakapalli district had a sex ratio of 1020 females per 1000 males. Scheduled Castes and Scheduled Tribes make up 158,060 (9.15%) and 47,975 (2.78%) of the population respectively.

Telugu was the predominant language, spoken by 98.87% of the population.

References 

2022 establishments in Andhra Pradesh
Districts of Andhra Pradesh